In England, Sites of Special Scientific Interest (SSSIs) are designated by Natural England, which is responsible for protecting England's natural environment. Designation as an SSSI gives legal protection to the most important wildlife and geological sites. As of August 2019, there are 37 sites designated in Greater London, 30 of which have been designated for their biological interest and 7 for their geological interest. Two sites are Special Protection Areas, three are Special Areas of Conservation, one is a Ramsar wetland site, two are national nature reserves, nine are local nature reserves, seven are Geological Conservation Review sites, one is a Nature Conservation Review site, one is on the Register of Historic Parks and Gardens and one includes a scheduled monument. Three sites are managed by the London Wildlife Trust, two by the Essex Wildlife Trust, two by the Kent Wildlife Trust, one by the Herts and Middlesex Wildlife Trust, one by the Royal Society for the Protection of Birds and one by the Wildfowl & Wetlands Trust.

Greater London is one of the largest urban areas in Europe, with an area of 1,572 km2 (607 sq mi). Its boundaries were set in 1965 when Greater London, which covers the 32 London boroughs and the City of London, was created. Almost two-thirds of it is green space and wetlands. Its population according to the 2011 census was 8.17 million.

Key

Interest
B = a site of biological interest
G = a site of geological interest

Access
 Yes  = free public access to all or most of the site
 PP = free public access to part of the site
 PL = public access at limited times
 NO = no public access

Other classifications
EWT = Essex Wildlife Trust
GCR = Geological Conservation Review
HMWT = Herts and Middlesex Wildlife Trust
KWT = Kent Wildlife Trust
LNR = Local nature reserve
LWT = London Wildlife Trust
NCR = Nature Conservation Review
NNR = National nature reserve
Ramsar = Ramsar site, an internationally important wetland site
RHPG = Register of Historic Parks and Gardens
RSPB = Royal Society for the Protection of Birds
SAC = Special Area of Conservation
SM = Scheduled monument
SPA = Special Protection Area
WWT = Wildfowl & Wetlands Trust

Sites

See also

List of Local Nature Reserves in Greater London
London Wildlife Trust

Notes

References

 
London
SSSI